Central Toronto Academy (CTA); formerly Central Commerce Collegiate Institute and originally High School of Commerce and Finance is a public, semestered secondary school in Toronto, Ontario, Canada. Located in the Palmerston-Little Italy neighbourhood, it is operated by the Toronto District School Board. Before 1998, the school was part of the former Toronto Board of Education.

The school was founded in 1911 as an offshoot of the Central Technical School. The eight commercial classes which had been taking place in Central Tech were first moved to King Edward Public School and then to Clinton Street Public School. In 1916, the classes were moved into a permanent home when the Collegiate Gothic Central High School of Commerce building opened as a school of business and commerce on Shaw Street. Over the years it has developed into a composite school that offers a broad range of programs, complemented by a full range of core academic subjects, computer classes, music, art, drama, and health and physical education. Courses are offered at the University, University/College and College levels for grade 12 students. Central Commerce Collegiate was renamed to Central Toronto Academy in September 2014.

Sports

CTA is well known for its senior boys' basketball team which won the 2008 TBSSAA City Championship for "AAA" OFSAA. The team also received the bronze medal in the "AAA" OFSAA tournament. CTA is also well known for their REACH basketball program. More recently the senior boys' basketball team had won the gold medal in the 2017 "A" OFSAA tournament.

Focus
In September 2014, Central Commerce Collegiate Institute was renamed Central Toronto Academy because of the change in the school's ethos, from a school focusing on business and commerce to one whose focus is on arts, academics, and athletics. The school also offers Advanced Placement courses.

Central Toronto Academy also offers a Specialist High Skills Major (SHSM) program that focuses on social entrepreneurship. This social entrepreneurship SHSM is a ministry-approved specialized enhancement program that allows students to gain valuable transferable skills while meeting the requirements for the Ontario Secondary School Diploma.  Based on active partnerships with business leaders (such as Royal Bank of
Canada and Toronto fashion experts at GotStyle ) and major university and college partners (such as Ryerson, Ivey School of Business, University of Toronto, Humber College, George Brown ) this program enables students to develop essential skills and work habits required for successful further education and the workplace.

The school was awarded a contract with the Ontario Power Authority in 2013 for a solar panel rooftop installation, solidifying the schools' environmentally conscious reputation and offering perspectives in renewable energies for students.

Extra curricular activities

The school offers many extra curricular clubs such as Anime Club, Band, Bike Club, Biz@CTA, Book Club, Chess Club, Choir, CTA Connect, Dance Club, Dance Pack, Drama Club, Eco-Club, Film Club, Gay-Straight Alliance, Guitar Club, History Club, Homework Club, Morning Radio, Origami Club, Stage Crew, Student Activist, Student Council, CTA SIXess, Web Club, and Yearbook. Teams include: Badminton, Basketball, Cross Country Running, Hockey, Indoor Soccer, Soccer, Table Tennis, Track and Field, Ultimate Frisbee, and Volleyball.

The first X-Men movie with notable actors such as Halle Berry and Hugh Jackman was filmed outside the school.

See also
List of high schools in Ontario

References

External links

Central Toronto Academy
Central Toronto Academy tdsb
Teacher of the Year: Creating a love and passion for art through teachingl

Schools in the TDSB
High schools in Toronto
Educational institutions established in 1911
1911 establishments in Ontario